Arthur de Beauplan (20 June 1823 – 11 May 1890 ), The son of the writer and composer Amédée de Beauplan, he wrote numerous vaudevilles and libretti for opéras comiques for Adolphe Adam (La poupée de Nuremberg, 1852), Ferdinand Poise (Bonsoir, voisin, 1853) or Théodore Dubois (Le Pain bis ou La Lilloise, 1879), in collaboration in particular with Adolphe de Leuven and Léon Lévy Brunswick.

He was made a knight in the Order of the Legion of Honour in 1858. In 1868, he was appointed Imperial Commissioner of the Théâtre de l'Odeon then of the opera houses and of the Conservatoire de Paris Head office of the theaters, he became Deputy Director in the Académie des Beaux-Arts in 1871.

Works 
Theatre

Les Suites d'un feu d'artifice, vaudeville in 1 act with Clairville and Léon Battu, 14 November 1848, Théâtre du Vaudeville
Les Grenouilles qui demandent un roi, vaudeville in 1 act with Clairville and J. Cordier, 26 February 1849, Gymnase-Dramatique
La Montagne qui accouche, vaudeville in 1 act with Charles Varin, 30 May 1849, Gymnase-Dramatique
Rosette et nœud coulant, vaudeville en 1 act with Mélesville, 19 January 1850, Théâtre Montansier
Un coup d’État, vaudeville in 1 act with Adolphe de Leuven and Léon Lévy Brunswick, 25 February 1850, Théâtre du Gymnase
L'Amour mouillé, comédie-vaudeville in 1 act with Michel Carré and Jules Barbier, 5 May 1850, Théâtre du Gymnase
Suffrage Ier ou le Royaume des aveugles, journal-vaudeville with Adolphe de Leuven and Léon Lévy Brunswick, 9 May 1850, Théâtre du Vaudeville
Les Pavés sur le pavé, revue-vaudeville in 1 act with Adolphe de Leuven and Léon-Lévy Brunswick, 2 September 1850, Théâtre du Vaudeville
Les Baignoires du Gymnase, vaudeville in 1 act with Adolphe de Leuven, 31 October 1850, Théâtre du Gymnase
Le Règne des escargots, revue-vaudeville in 3 acts with Adolphe de Leuven and Léon Lévy Brunswick, 23 November 1850, Théâtre du Vaudeville
Hortense de Cerny, comedy in 2 acts mingled with song with Jean-François Bayard, 24 November 1851, Théâtre du Vaudeville
Claudine ou les Avantages de l'inconduite, étude pastorale et berrichonne with Paul Siraudin, 22 February 1851, Théâtre du Palais-Royal
Thérèse, ou Ange et Diable, comédie-vaudeville in 2 acts with Jean-François Bayard, 29 October 1852, Théâtre du Gymnase
Élisa ou Un chapitre de l'Oncle Tom, comedy in acts, 21 February 1853, Théâtre du Gymnase
Boccace ou le Décaméron, comedy in 5 acts mingled with song with Jean-François Bayard, Adolphe de Leuven and Léon Lévy Brunswick, 23 February 1853, Théâtre du Vaudeville
Un notaire à marier, comédie-vaudeville in 3 acts with Eugène Labiche and Marc-Michel,  19 March 1853, Théâtre des Variétés
Un coup de vent, vaudeville in 1 act with Varin and Léon-Lévy Brunswick, 22 May 1853, Théâtre du Palais-Royal
Le Lys dans la vallée, drama in 5 acts after Balzac with Théodore Barrière, 14 June 1853, Théâtre-Français
Un feu de cheminée, vaudeville in 1 act with Eugène Labiche, 31 July 1853, Théâtre du Palais-Royal
To be or not to be, comedy in 2 acts mingled with couplets with Léon-Lévy Brunswick, 19 October 1853, Théâtre du Palais-Royal
Un mari qui ronfle, vaudeville in 1 act with Paul Siraudin, 2 November 1854, Théâtre des Variétés
Les Pièges dorés, comedy in 3 acts, 21 January 1856, Théâtre-Français
Les Toquades de Boromée, vaudeville in 1 act with Léon-Lévy Brunswick, 20 February 1856, Théâtre du Palais-Royal
 Les Marrons glacés, comedy in 1 act mingled with song, 30 December 1856, Théâtre du Palais-Royal
L'École des ménages, comedy in 5 acts in verses after Balzac, 11 May 1858, Théâtre de l'Odéon
Les Plantes parasites ou la Vie en famille, comedy in 4 acts, 7 May 1862, Théâtre du Vaudeville

Opéras comiques
La Poupée de Nuremberg, opéra comique in 1 act with Adolphe de Leuven, music by Adolphe Adam, 21 February 1852, Théâtre-Lyrique 
Guillery le Trompette, opéra comique in 2 acts with Adolphe de Leuven, music by Salvatore Sarmiento, 8 December 1852, Théâtre-Lyrique
Bonsoir, voisin, opéra comique in 1 act with Léon Lévy Brunswick, music by Ferdinand Poise, 18 September 1853, Théâtre-Lyrique
Dans les vignes, tableau villageois in 1 act with Louis Lhérie, music by Louis Clapisson, 31 December 1854, Théâtre-Lyrique 
 Mam'zelle Geneviève, opéra comique in 2 acts with Léon Lévy Brunswick, music byAdolphe Adam, 24 March 1856, Théâtre-Lyrique 
Le Pain bis ou La Lilloise, opéra comique in 1 act with Léon Lévy Brunswick, music by Théodore Dubois, 26 February 1879, Opéra-Comique

Texts
1843: Le Monument de Molière, Breteau et Pichery, Paris
1883: Dix Satires, avec prologue et épilogue, Librairie universelle, Paris
1885: Les Sept Paroles, Librairie des auteurs modernes, Paris

Source : Catalogue général de la BNF

Bibliography 
 Louis Gustave Vapereau, Dictionnaire universel des littératures, Paris, Hachette, 1893,  (Read on line  Gallica)  
 Christian Goubault, « Arthur de Beauplan » in Joël-Marie Fauquet (dir.), Dictionnaire de la musique en France au XIXe siècle, Fayard, Paris, 2003

References 

19th-century French dramatists and playwrights
French librettists
Chevaliers of the Légion d'honneur
Writers from Paris
1823 births
1890 deaths